Jozef "Jožo" Ráž (born 24 October 1954) is a Slovak singer–songwriter and bassist from Bratislava known mainly for his work with the group Elán.

Career
Jožo Ráž founded the pop-rock band Elán in 1968 together with his school classmates Vašo Patejdl, Juraj Farkaš, and Zdeno Baláž. They became one of the most popular Czechoslovak bands during the 1980s, releasing ten successful albums between 1981 and 1991.

He is also an occasional actor: in 1989, he played himself in the fictionalized film about the band Elán, Rabaka.

Personal life
Ráž graduated from the Faculty of Arts, Comenius University in Bratislava. In the summer of 1999, while riding his motorcycle in Bratislava's city center, Ráž was hit by a car, causing him a serious head injury as well as a broken nose, wrist, and right leg.

The musician has expressed controversial views in the past, such as in 2012, when he stated "I am not a racist, but I am afraid of the Chinese—there are many of them " He has also voiced his support for authoritative leaders such as Gustáv Husák, Vladimír Mečiar, Robert Fico, Fidel Castro, and Vladimir Putin.

Ráž's son Jozef Ráž Jr. was nominated for the position of Slovak Minister of the Interior in March 2018 for the Direction – Social Democracy party, but President Andrej Kiska refused his appointment.

Discography

See also
 OST Fontána pre Zuzanu 2
 The 100 Greatest Slovak Albums of All Time

References

External links

 

1954 births
Living people
21st-century Slovak male singers
20th-century Slovak male singers
Czechoslovak male singers